Scott Matthew Olsen (born January 12, 1984) is an American former pitcher. He played in Major League Baseball for the Florida Marlins and Washington Nationals between 2005 and 2010.

Early life
Olsen was born in Kalamazoo, Michigan.  He attended Crystal Lake South High School in Crystal Lake, Illinois, for high school where he was all-conference in baseball. He was drafted 173rd overall during the sixth round of the 2002 Major League Baseball Draft by the Florida Marlins.

MLB career

Florida Marlins

2005 season
Olsen played his first season in the MLB in 2005 with the Florida Marlins. The team activated him on June 25, 2005, when pitcher Josh Beckett went on the disabled list. Olsen had one win and one loss in five starts, with a 3.98 ERA during the season, but was also later sent to the disabled list with an elbow injury.

2006 season
During the 2006 season with the Florida Marlins, Olsen went 12–10 with a 4.04 ERA. With his 10+ wins and the 10+ wins of his fellow rookies Josh Johnson, Ricky Nolasco and Aníbal Sánchez, the 2006 Marlins became the first team in Major League Baseball history with four rookie pitchers with ten or more wins in one season.

With his 166 strikeouts in 2006, Olsen held the single-season record for the most strikeouts by a Marlins rookie until it was broken in 2013 by José Fernandez. He had two 10-or-more strikeout games: 11 vs. the Pittsburgh Pirates on July 27 and 10 vs. the New York Mets on August 1. His 11-strikeout performance against Pittsburgh was the most by any Marlins pitcher during the 2006 season.

2007 season

As a hitter, Olsen began the 2007 season 6-for-14 with two runs batted in.

Olsen finished the season with a 10–15 record and a 5.81 ERA, the latter of which was the worst among qualified starters in the majors. He had 133 strikeouts in 176 innings. He was tied with two other Marlins starters for the most wins during the season. His .384 OBP-against was also the highest in the majors, as was his .315 batting-average-against and .504 slugging-percentage-against.

2008 season
With the departure of Dontrelle Willis, Olsen admitted to reporters that he coveted the "pitching ace" role. However, Ricky Nolasco put himself in that role with a break-out season. Olsen's 13 intentional walks given up for the season were the most in the majors.

Washington Nationals
On November 11, he was traded with left fielder Josh Willingham to the Washington Nationals for second baseman Emilio Bonifacio, and minor leaguers right-hander P.J. Dean, and infielder Jake Smolinski.

Shoulder tendinitis forced Olsen to miss about a month and a half, from May 16 to June 29.

Olsen missed the rest of the season following a diagnosis of a left labrum tear following a mid-July start. Surgery to repair the labrum was performed on July 23, 2009.

On December 12, 2009, Olsen, was non-tendered a contract by the Washington Nationals, making him a free agent.

On December 13. 2009 Olsen, re-signed with the Washington Nationals for 1 year at $1 million.

In  Olsen started in the minors, but after one class AAA start was called up. In early May he took a no-hitter into the eighth inning against the Atlanta Braves. The game took place amidst a five-game streak where Olsen went 2–0 with a 1.11 ERA. On May 21, he experienced stiffness in his left shoulder that forced him to the disabled list.

On November 6, 2010, Olsen was outrighted by the Nationals, and elected free agency.

Pittsburgh Pirates
On December 6, 2010, Olsen tentatively agreed to a one-year, incentive-laden agreement with the Pittsburgh Pirates. He was released on May 14, 2011.

Chicago White Sox
On January 25, 2012, Olsen signed a minor league contract with the Chicago White Sox. The deal included a major league option for 2013. He was released on July 7, 2012.

Texas Rangers
He signed a minor league contract with the Texas Rangers after the 2012 season.

Suspensions, confrontations and legal trouble
Olsen has had a history of disciplinary problems with the Marlins and legal issues. He was given a black eye by friend and then-teammate Randy Messenger during the 2006 season. Shortly afterwards, then-manager Joe Girardi pulled Olsen by the collar and confronted him.

In a 7–6 loss to the New York Mets on July 9, 2006, there was an incident involving then-teammate Miguel Cabrera. While pitching to Mets catcher Paul Lo Duca, Lo Duca hit a hard grounder that glanced off Cabrera's glove and rolled into left field. A run scored and Lo Duca raced to second for a double. While the ball glanced off of Cabrera's glove, Olsen seemed to believe that Cabrera did not give his full effort to get to the ball, and as they came off the field, Olsen could be seen shouting something at Cabrera. A moment later, television cameras showed Cabrera in the crowded dugout reaching past teammates to poke his finger at Olsen as the pitcher walked past him. Olsen tried to jab back at Cabrera, who charged Olsen and tried to kick the pitcher before both players were quickly separated by teammates.

In September 2006, Olsen said he hated the Philadelphia Phillies because they dominated the Marlins. His emotions boiled over in the sixth inning of a May 2007 game versus the Phillies, when he became angry at Chase Utley for calling time just before a pitch. The next pitch was ball four, and Utley trotted to first base as Olsen angrily shouted and waved his glove at him.

In June 2007, Olsen received an unspecified fine for making an obscene gesture towards fans during a game against the Milwaukee Brewers in Milwaukee.

On July 15, 2007, during a start against the Washington Nationals, Olsen had a confrontation with pitcher Sergio Mitre in the tunnel heading toward the team clubhouse. Olsen ripped his jersey off and tossed it in the direction of a trainer. According to a source, Mitre and other Marlins took exception to Olsen's actions. As they left the dugout area, Mitre pinned Olsen against a wall before the two were separated by teammates. Olsen then received a two-game suspension for insubordination, but was still scheduled to make his next start the following Friday against the Cincinnati Reds.

After serving his two-game suspension, and after making his scheduled July 20, 2007, start, Olsen was arrested by police in Aventura, Florida after fleeing from police following a speeding violation (he was clocked going 48 mph in a 35 mph zone). He fled for about a mile, at which point he stopped at his home and sat in a plastic chair in the front yard. When police arrived and tried to arrest him, he kicked at the officers who then used a taser to subdue him. Olsen failed a field sobriety test and refused a breathalyzer test. He was booked on charges of driving under the influence, resisting arrest with violence and fleeing and eluding a police officer.

References

External links

1984 births
Living people
Sportspeople from Kalamazoo, Michigan
Baseball players from Michigan
Major League Baseball pitchers
Gulf Coast Marlins players
Greensboro Bats players
Jupiter Hammerheads players
Carolina Mudcats players
Albuquerque Isotopes players
Syracuse Chiefs players
Potomac Nationals players
Gulf Coast Nationals players
Hagerstown Suns players
Bristol White Sox players
Charlotte Knights players
Florida Marlins players
Washington Nationals players
People from Aventura, Florida
People from Berrien County, Michigan